

Muhlis Akarsu (20 February 1948 – 2 July 1993) was a Turkish folk singer and Bağlama player. He was killed, along with 34 others, during the Sivas massacre in Sivas, Turkey when a group of Islamist rioters set fire to the hotel where the victims had gathered for the Pir Sultan Abdal festival.

See also
List of Turkish musicians
List of massacres in Turkey

References

External links
 

1948 births
1993 deaths
Alevi singers
Deaths from fire
Mass murder victims
People murdered in Turkey
Turkish folk musicians
Turkish folk singers
Turkish murder victims
Turkish singers